Pacey is an English surname and given name variant of Passy, a French locational origin surname, itself derived from the Gallo-Roman Praenomen Paccius. The surname Pacey migrated to England during the 12th Century and eventually evolved also into a given name. Pacey, itself a variant, is associated also with "Passie" (but not "Passi"), "Peacey", and "Piosey".

Notable people and characters with the name include:

Surname 

Dave Pacey (born 1936), English footballer
Dennis Pacey (1928–2009), English footballer
Desmond Pacey (1917–1975), Canadian literary critic
Eric Pacey (born 1978), Canadian lacrosse player 
Steven Pacey (born 1957), English actor

Given name 

Pacey Witter (born 1983), fictional character on Dawson's Creek

References